Beizheng is a township of Jingxing County, Hebei, China, located adjacent to the Jingxing Mining District. , it had 8 villages under its administration.

See also
List of township-level divisions of Hebei

References

Township-level divisions of Hebei